Ebisuchō Station is the name of two train stations in Japan:

 Ebisuchō Station (Osaka) (恵美須町駅)
 Ebisu-cho Station (Hiroshima) (胡町駅)